Alfred Sim Chee Hao (born 4 October 1981), is a Singaporean singer and athletics coach. He is best known for being the overall winner of the third season of reality singing competition Project SuperStar.

Singing career
Sim auditioned for the first and second seasons of Project Superstar in 2005 and 2006 respectively, but he did not make it as one of the finalists.

In 2011, Sim became part of Sparkle Live Music, which was founded by singer Tay Kewei, her sister Tay Kexin, and keyboardist Lee Ein Ein, in which he performs songs at weddings. Sim also participated in Guinness Live, a competition "to find the next William Scorpion", representing Team Firefly, along with Howie Yeo, Willis Loye and Yee Si Ling, managed by Fatt Zhai. They were the eventual champions, winning each member a winner's single.

In 2013, Sim sung the theme song of television series The Journey: A Voyage, entitled 家乡 (Homeland). It was nominated as Best Drama Theme Song for MediaCorp's Star Awards 20.

In 2014, Sim took part in the third season of reality singing competition Project SuperStar, in which he received 52 percent of the public votes via the app Toggle Now, defeating Abigail Yeo's 48 percent. He won a $15,000 cash prize and a one-year MediaCorp contract.

In May 2015, Sim was invited to take part in the Singapore auditions for the fourth season of The Voice of China, and eventually won the auditions. He was unfortunately eliminated later on in the competition.

On 11 November 2015, Sim released his first single, "Lover", a cover of Beyond's song.

On 14 January 2016, Sim released his first EP "等到沈志豪".

On 27 February 2016, Sim headlined alongside Zhang Kefan, Allan Moo, Guan Dehui & Desmond Ng for the High 5 Power Concert at the Resorts World Theatre.

On 17 June 2016, Sim was a guest artist in his wife's Tay Kewei's solo concert "Chi".

In December 2016, Sim and Tay Kewei represented Singapore at the China-ASEAN Friendship Concert in Hainan, singing their original duet "以爱为豪".

Sim held his first solo concert "Huayi 华艺 Livehouse!" at the Esplanade Annex on 3 February 2017.

Sim was also selected to perform CHINGAY 2017 Theme Song "Rainbow in Our Hearts"

Sim represented Singapore at the Hong Kong Asian-Pop Music Festival 2017. He finished as overall Top 3 and managed to win the "Best Stage Performance" award.

In September 2017, Sim performed at the Stärker Music Carnival 2017 which headlined Taiwanese vocal powerhouse, A-Lin.

In March 2021, Sim held 'RE:BIRTH' concert together with Tay Kewei. at Sands Theatre.

Athletics career
Sim completed his degree in Bachelor of Exercise and Sports Science at the Edith Cowan University. Since 2008, Sim has been a youth development coach for the Singapore Athletic Association, and has trained athletes such as Calvin Kang Li Loong, Shalindran Sathiyanesan and Joshua Lim. In 2010, Sim founded Reactiv, which specialises in training athletes.

Sim was awarded the POSB Everyday Champions Award 2009, organised by POSB Bank and Singapore Sports Council. In the same year, SSC awarded him with the High Performance Coaches Scholarship.

Personal life 
Sim married Tay Kewei in January 2015. Together, they have three sons.

Filmography

TV Series
{|class="wikitable"
|-
!Year
!Title
!Role
!Network
!Ref
|-
| rowspan="1" | 2015 || Crescendo 起飞 || Singing competition host ||
|
|-
| rowspan="1" | 2016 || Don't Worry, Be Healthy 家有一保 || Chen Zida 陈子达 ||
|
|-
| rowspan="1" | 2016 || You Can Be an Angel 2 你也可以是天使2 || ||
|
|-
| rowspan="" 1 | 2017 || Dream Coder 梦想程式 || Kay ||
|
|-
| rowspan="1" | 2021 || Live Your Dreams 大大的夢想 || || ||
|-
|}

Awards

Discography

EPsAlfred'' 等到沈志豪 (2016)

Singles

Drama Soundtracks

Accolades

Star Awards

Asian Television Awards

References

Living people
Singaporean people of Chinese descent
1981 births
21st-century Singaporean male singers
Singaporean Mandopop singers